Georgi Skhirtladze (9 November 1932 – 25 March 2008) was a wrestler from Soviet Georgia. He was Olympic silver medalist in Freestyle wrestling in 1960 and bronze medalist in 1956, competing for the Soviet Union. He won a gold medal at the 1959 World Wrestling Championships.

References

External links

1932 births
2008 deaths
People from Samegrelo-Zemo Svaneti
Soviet male sport wrestlers
Olympic wrestlers of the Soviet Union
Wrestlers at the 1956 Summer Olympics
Wrestlers at the 1960 Summer Olympics
Male sport wrestlers from Georgia (country)
Olympic silver medalists for the Soviet Union
Olympic bronze medalists for the Soviet Union
Olympic medalists in wrestling
Medalists at the 1960 Summer Olympics
Medalists at the 1956 Summer Olympics